Argentina competed at the 2017 World Aquatics Championships in Budapest, Hungary from 14 to 30 July.

Open water swimming

Argentina entered five open water swimmers

Swimming

Argentine swimmers achieved qualifying standards in the following events (up to a maximum of 2 swimmers in each event at the A-standard entry time, and 1 at the B-standard):

Men

Women

Mixed

Synchronized swimming

Argentina's synchronized swimming team consisted of 2 athletes (2 female).

Women

References

Nations at the 2017 World Aquatics Championships
2017
World Aquatics Championships